The Tintic Standard Reduction Mill—also known as the Tintic Mill or Harold Mill—built in 1920, and only operating from 1921 to 1925, is an abandoned refinery or concentrator located on the west slope of Warm Springs Mountain on the southern edge of Genola, Utah, United States. Has been found to contain high levels of arsenic and lead which can lead to serious health problems and can result in death.

Description

The mill was designed and built by  W. C. Madge. It is significant as the only American mill using the Augustin process during the early 1920s. Metals processed at the mill included copper, gold, silver, and lead, all of which were received from another mill near Eureka. The metal content of ore was increased through the process to make transportation less expensive. The reducing process used was an acid-brine chloridizing and leaching process which became outdated, leading to the abandonment of the site in 1925. At the mill's highest productivity it processed 200 tons of ore daily from the Tintic Mining District.

What remains of the mill are foundations for water tanks, crushers, roasters, iron boxes, leaching tanks, and drain boxes. The site dominates the surrounding landscape with its size and unique colors and shapes. It has been speculated that the mill may be the contributor of heavy metal pollution in the Warm Springs which lie below it.

It was listed on the National Register of Historic Places September 13, 1978.

See also

Tintic Smelter Site, site of a different "Tintic Mill", near Eureka in Juab County, Utah
 National Register of Historic Places listings in Utah County, Utah

References

 Warm-Water Interim Hatchery Facility - Environmental Assessment. Utah Reclamation Mitigation Conservation Commission.
 National Register of Historic Places

External links

 The Center for Land Use Interpretation - Includes a photo of the site.
 
  - An early photo of the Mill from the Utah State Historical Society.

Buildings and structures in Utah County, Utah
Industrial buildings and structures in Utah
Landmarks in Utah
Manufacturing plants in the United States
Industrial buildings completed in 1920
Mining in Utah
Industrial buildings and structures on the National Register of Historic Places in Utah
Historic American Engineering Record in Utah
Genola, Utah
National Register of Historic Places in Utah County, Utah